Mopti Airport , also known as Ambodedjo Airport, serves the city of Mopti, in the Mopti Region in Mali. It is located near the town of Sévaré.

Facilities

Airlines and destinations

References

External links
 
 

Airports in Mali